Remini Chere Elisabeth Rumbewas (born 9 October 2000) is an Indonesian footballer who plays a defender for Persis Women and the Indonesia women's national team.

Club career

Asprov Papua/Toli FC
Remini represented Asprov Papua (the Provincial Football Association of Papua) in the Pertiwi Cup with Toli FC. She played  as a captain and one of the key in the team's 2021–22 Pertiwi Cup victory.

Persis Women
On 22 August 2022, new women's club Persis Women announced Remini as their player.

International career 
Remini represented Indonesia at the 2022 AFC Women's Asian Cup.

Honours

Club
Toli FC
 Pertiwi Cup: 2021–22

References

External links

2000 births
Living people
People from Biak Numfor Regency
Indonesian women's footballers
Women's association football defenders
Indonesia women's international footballers
Papuan sportspeople